Achroosia is a monotypic moth genus in the subfamily Arctiinae. Its single species, Achroosia nuda, is found in Espírito Santo, Brazil. Both the genus and species were first described by George Hampson in 1900.

References

Lithosiini
Monotypic moth genera
Moths of South America